De-extinction (also known as resurrection biology, or species revivalism) is the process of generating an organism that either resembles or is an extinct species. There are several ways to carry out the process of de-extinction. Cloning is the most widely proposed method, although genome editing and selective breeding have also been considered. Similar techniques have been applied to certain endangered species, in hopes to boost their genetic diversity. The only method of the three that would provide an animal with the same genetic identity is cloning. There are benefits and malefits to the process of de-extinction ranging from technological advancements to ethical issues.

Methods

Cloning

Cloning is a commonly suggested method for the potential restoration of an extinct species. It can be done by extracting the nucleus from a preserved cell from the extinct species and swapping it into an egg, without a nucleus, of that species' nearest living relative. The egg can then be inserted into a host from the extinct species' nearest living relative. It is important to note that this method can only be used when a preserved cell is available, meaning it would be most feasible for recently extinct species. Cloning has been used in science since the 1950s. One of the most well known clones is Dolly the sheep. Dolly was born in the mid 1990s and lived a normal life until she experienced health complications that led to her death. Other animal species known to have been cloned include dogs, pigs, and horses.

Genome editing 
Genome editing has been rapidly advancing with the help of the CRISPR/Cas systems, particularly CRISPR/Cas9. The CRISPR/Cas9 system was originally discovered as part of the bacterial immune system. Viral DNA that was injected into the bacterium became incorporated into the bacterial chromosome at specific regions. These regions are called clustered regularly interspaced short palindromic repeats, otherwise known as CRISPR. Since the viral DNA is within the chromosome, it gets transcribed into RNA. Once this occurs, the Cas9 binds to the RNA. Cas9 can recognize the foreign insert and cleaves it. This discovery was very crucial because now the Cas protein can be viewed as a scissor in the genome editing process.

By using cells from a closely related species to the extinct species, genome editing can play a role in the de-extinction process. Germ cells may be edited directly, so that the egg and sperm produced by the extant parent species will produce offspring of the extinct species, or somatic cells may be edited and transferred via somatic cell nuclear transfer. The result is an animal which is not completely the extinct species, but rather a hybrid of the extinct species and the closely related, non-extinct species. Because it is possible to sequence and assemble the genome of extinct organisms from highly degraded tissues, this technique enables scientists to pursue de-extinction in a wider array of species, including those for which no well-preserved remains exist. However, the more degraded and old the tissue from the extinct species is, the more fragmented the resulting DNA will be, making genome assembly more challenging.

Back breeding 

Back breeding is a form of selective breeding. As opposed to breeding animals for a trait to advance the species in selective breeding, back breeding involves breeding animals for an ancestral characteristic that may not be seen throughout the species as frequently. This method can recreate the traits of an extinct species, but the genome will differ from the original species. Back breeding, however, is contingent on the ancestral trait of the species still being in the population in any frequency. Back breeding is also a form of artificial selection by the deliberate selective breeding of domestic animals, in an attempt to achieve an animal breed with a phenotype that resembles a wild type ancestor, usually one that has gone extinct. Breeding back is not to be confused with dedomestication.

Iterative evolution

A natural process of de-extinction is iterative evolution. This occurs when a species becomes extinct, but then after some time a different species evolves into an almost identical creature. For example, the Aldabra rail was a flightless bird that lived on the island of Aldabra. It had evolved some time in the past from the flighted white-throated rail, but became extinct about 136,000 years ago due to an unknown event that caused sea levels to rise. About 100,000 years ago, sea levels dropped and the island reappeared, with no fauna. The white-throated rail recolonized the island, but soon evolved into a flightless species taxonomically identical to the extinct species.

Advantages of de-extinction 

The technologies being developed for de-extinction could lead to large advances in various fields:

An advance in genetic technologies that are used to improve the cloning process for de-extinction could be used to prevent endangered species from becoming extinct.
By studying revived previously extinct animals, cures to diseases could be discovered.
Revived species may support conservation initiatives by acting as "flagship species" to generate public enthusiasm and funds for conserving entire ecosystems.

Prioritising de-extinction could lead to the improvement of current conservation strategies. Conservation measures would initially be necessary in order to reintroduce a species into the ecosystem, until the revived population can sustain itself in the wild. Reintroduction of an extinct species could also help improve ecosystems that had been destroyed by human development. It may also be argued that reviving species driven to extinction by humans is an ethical obligation.

Disadvantages of de-extinction 
The reintroduction of extinct species could have a negative impact on extant species and their ecosystem. The extinct species' ecological niche may have been filled in its former habitat, making it an invasive species. This could lead to the extinction of other species due to competition for food or other competitive exclusion. It could also lead to the extinction of prey species if they have more predators in an environment that had few predators before the reintroduction of an extinct species. If a species has been extinct for a long period of time the environment they are introduced to could be wildly different from the one that they can survive in. The changes in the environment due to human development could mean that the species may not survive if reintroduced into that ecosystem. A species could also become extinct again after de-extinction if the reasons for its extinction are still a threat. The woolly mammoth might be hunted by poachers just like elephants for their ivory and could go extinct again if this were to happen. Or, if a species is reintroduced into an environment with disease it has no immunity to the reintroduced species could be wiped out by a disease that current species can survive.

De-extinction is a very expensive process. Bringing back one species can cost millions of dollars. The money for de-extinction would most likely come from current conservation efforts. These efforts could be weakened if funding is taken from conservation and put into de-extinction. This would mean that critically endangered species would start to go extinct faster because there are no longer resources that are needed to maintain their populations. Also, since cloning techniques cannot perfectly replicate a species as it existed in the wild, the reintroduction of the species may not bring about positive environmental benefits. They may not have the same role in the food chain that they did before and therefore cannot restore damaged ecosystems.

Current candidates for de-extinction

Woolly mammoth 

The existence of preserved soft tissue remains and DNA from woolly mammoths has led to the idea that the species could be recreated by scientific means. Two methods have been proposed to achieve this. The first would be to use the cloning process, however even the most intact mammoth samples have had little usable DNA because of their conditions of preservation. There is not enough DNA intact to guide the production of an embryo. The second method would involve artificially inseminating an elephant egg cell with preserved sperm of the mammoth. The resulting offspring would be a hybrid of the mammoth and its closest living relative the Asian elephant. After several generations of cross-breeding these hybrids, an almost pure woolly mammoth could be produced. However, sperm cells of modern mammals are typically potent for up to 15 years after deep-freezing, which could hinder this method. In 2008, a Japanese team found usable DNA in the brains of mice that had been frozen for 16 years. They hope to use similar methods to find usable mammoth DNA. In 2011, Japanese scientists announced plans to clone mammoths within six years.

In March 2014, the Russian Association of Medical Anthropologists reported that blood recovered from a frozen mammoth carcass in 2013 would now provide a good opportunity for cloning the woolly mammoth. Another way to create a living woolly mammoth would be to migrate genes from the mammoth genome into the genes of its closest living relative, the Asian elephant, to create hybridized animals with the notable adaptations that it had for living in a much colder environment than modern day elephants. This is currently being done by a team led by Harvard geneticist George Church. The team has made changes in the elephant genome with the genes that gave the woolly mammoth its cold-resistant blood, longer hair, and an extra layer of fat. According to geneticist Hendrik Poinar, a revived woolly mammoth or mammoth-elephant hybrid may find suitable habitat in the tundra and taiga forest ecozones.

George Church has hypothesized the positive effects of bringing back the extinct woolly mammoth would have on the environment, such as the potential for reversing some of the damage caused by global warming. He and his fellow researchers predict that mammoths would eat the dead grass allowing the sun to reach the spring grass; their weight would allow them to break through dense, insulating snow in order to let cold air reach the soil; and their characteristic of felling trees would increase the absorption of sunlight. In an editorial condemning de-extinction, Scientific American pointed out that the technologies involved could have secondary applications, specifically to help species on the verge of extinction regain their genetic diversity.

Pyrenean ibex 

The Pyrenean ibex was a subspecies of Spanish ibex that lived on the Iberian peninsula. While it was abundant through medieval times, over-hunting in the 19th and 20th centuries led to its demise. In 1999, only a single female named Celia was left alive in Ordesa National Park. Scientists captured her, took a tissue sample from her ear, collared her, then released her back into the wild, where she lived until she was found dead in 2000, having been crushed by a fallen tree. In 2003, scientists used the tissue sample to attempt to clone Celia and resurrect the extinct subspecies. Despite having successfully transferred nuclei from her cells into domestic goat egg cells and impregnating 208 female goats, only one came to term. The baby ibex that was born had a lung defect, and lived for only seven minutes before suffocating from being incapable of breathing oxygen. Nevertheless, her birth was seen as a triumph and is considered the first de-extinction. In late 2013, scientists announced that they would again attempt to resurrect the Pyrenean ibex. A problem to be faced, in addition to the many challenges of reproduction of a mammal by cloning, is that only females can be produced by cloning the female individual Celia, and no males exist for those females to reproduce with. This could potentially be addressed by breeding female clones with the closely related Southeastern Spanish ibex, and gradually creating a hybrid animal that will eventually bear more resemblance to the Pyrenean ibex than the Southeastern Spanish ibex.

Aurochs 

The aurochs was widespread across Eurasia, North Africa, and the Indian subcontinent during the Pleistocene, but only the European aurochs (Bos primigenius primigenius) survived into historical times. This species is heavily featured in European cave paintings, such as Lascaux and Chauvet cave in France, and was still widespread during the Roman era. Following the fall of the Roman empire, overhunting of the aurochs by nobility caused its population to dwindle to a single population in the Jaktorów forest in Poland, where the last wild one died in 1627. However, because the aurochs is ancestral to most modern cattle breeds, it is possible for it to be brought back through selective or back breeding. The first attempt at this was by Heinz and Lutz Heck using modern cattle breeds, which resulted in the creation of Heck cattle. This breed has been introduced to nature preserves across Europe; however, it differs strongly from the aurochs in physical characteristics, and some modern attempts claim to try to create an animal that is nearly identical to the aurochs in morphology, behavior, and even genetics. There are several projects that aim to create a cattle breed similar to the aurochs through selectively breeding primitive cattle breeds over a course of twenty years to create a self-sufficient bovine grazer in herds of at least 150 animals in rewilded nature areas across Europe, for example the Tauros Programme and the Taurus Project. This organization is partnered with the organization Rewilding Europe to help restore balance to European nature. A competing project to recreate the aurochs is the Uruz Project by the True Nature Foundation, which aims to recreate the aurochs through a more efficient breeding strategy and through genome editing, in order to decrease the number of generations of breeding needed and the ability to quickly eliminate undesired traits from the aurochs-like cattle population. It is hoped that aurochs-like cattle will reinvigorate European nature by restoring its ecological role as a keystone species, and bring back biodiversity that disappeared following the decline of European megafauna, as well as helping to bring new economic opportunities related to European wildlife viewing.

Quagga 

The quagga (Equus quagga quagga) is a subspecies of the plains zebra that was distinct in that it was striped on its face and upper torso, but its rear abdomen was a solid brown. It was native to South Africa, but was wiped out in the wild due to overhunting for sport, and the last individual died in 1883 in the Amsterdam Zoo. However, since it is technically the same species as the surviving Plains zebra, it has been argued that the quagga could be revived through artificial selection. The Quagga Project aims to breed a similar form of zebra by selective breeding of plains zebras. This process is also known as back breeding. It also aims to release these animals onto the western Cape once an animal that fully resembles the quagga is achieved, which could have the benefit of eradicating introduced species of trees such as the Brazilian pepper tree, Tipuana tipu, Acacia saligna, Bugweed, Camphor tree, Stone pine, cluster pine, Weeping willow and Acacia mearnsii.

Thylacine 

The thylacine, commonly known as the Tasmanian Tiger, was native to the Australian mainland, Tasmania and New Guinea. It is believed to have become extinct in the 20th century. The thylacine had become extremely rare or extinct on the Australian mainland before British settlement of the continent. The last known thylacine, named Benjamin, died at the Hobart Zoo, on September 7, 1936. He is believed to have died as the result of neglect—locked out of his sheltered sleeping quarters, he was exposed to a rare occurrence of extreme Tasmanian weather: extreme heat during the day and freezing temperatures at night. Official protection of the species by the Tasmanian government was introduced on July 10, 1936, roughly 59 days before the last known specimen died in captivity.

In December 2017 it was announced in Nature Ecology and Evolution that the full nuclear genome of the thylacine had been successfully sequenced, marking the completion of the critical first step toward de-extinction that began in 2008, with the extraction of the DNA samples from the preserved pouch specimen. The Thylacine genome was reconstructed by using the genome editing method. The Tasmanian devil was used as a reference for the assembly of the full nuclear genome. Andrew J. Pask from the University of Melbourne has stated that the next step toward de-extinction will be to create a functional genome, which will require extensive research and development, estimating that a full attempt to resurrect the species may be possible as early as 2027.

In August 2022, the University of Melbourne and Colossal Biosciences announced a partnership to accelerate de-extinction of the thylacine.

Passenger pigeon 

The passenger pigeon numbered in the billions before being wiped out due to commercial hunting and habitat loss during the early 20th century. The non-profit Revive & Restore obtained DNA from the passenger pigeon from museum specimens and skins; however, this DNA is degraded because it is so old. For this reason, simple cloning would not be an effective way to perform de-extinction for this species because parts of the genome would be missing. Instead, Revive & Restore focuses on identifying mutations in the DNA that would cause a phenotypic difference between the extinct passenger pigeon and its closest living relative, the band-tailed pigeon. In doing this, they can determine how to modify the DNA of the band-tailed pigeon to change the traits to mimic the traits of the passenger pigeon. In this sense, the de-extinct passenger pigeon would not be genetically identical to the extinct passenger pigeon, but it would have the same traits. The de-extinct passenger pigeon hybrid is expected to be ready for captive breeding by 2024 and released into the wild by 2030.

Maclear's Rat 

The Maclear's rat (also known as the Christmas Island rat) was a large rat endemic to Christmas Island in the Indian Ocean. It is believed Maclear's rat might have been responsible for keeping the population of Christmas Island red crab in check. It is thought that the accidental introduction of black rats by the Challenger expedition infected the Maclear's rats with a disease (possibly a trypanosome), which resulted in the numbers of the species declining. The last recorded sighting was in 1903. In March 2022, researchers discovered the Maclear's Rat shared about 95 percent of its genes with the living Norway brown rat, thus sparking hopes in bringing the species back to life. Although scientists were mostly successful in using CRISPR technology to edit the DNA of the living species to match that of the extinct one, a few key genes were missing, which would mean resurrected rats would not be genetically pure replicas.

Future potential candidates for de-extinction
A "De-extinction Task Force" was established in April 2014 under the auspices of the Species Survival Commission (SSC) and
charged with drafting a set of Guiding Principles on Creating Proxies of Extinct Species for Conservation Benefit to position the
IUCN SSC on the rapidly emerging technological feasibility of creating a proxy of an extinct species.

Birds
 Little bush moa – a slender species of moa, slightly larger than a turkey that went extinct abruptly, around 500-600 years ago following the arrival and proliferation of the Maori people in New Zealand, as well as the introduction of Polynesian dogs. Scientists at Harvard University assembled the first nearly complete genome of the species from toe bones, thus bringing the species a step closer to being "resurrected". New Zealand politician Trevor Mallard had previously suggested bringing back a medium-sized species of moa.
 Heath hen – this subspecies of the prairie chicken became extinct on Martha's Vineyard in 1932 despite conservation efforts; however, the availability of usable DNA in museum specimens and protected areas in its former range makes this bird a possible candidate for de-extinction and reintroduction to its former habitat.
 Dodo – this large, flightless ground bird endemic to Mauritius was last sighted in the 1640s and was most likely extinct by 1700, due to exploitation by humans and due to introduced species such as rats and pigs, which ate their eggs. It has since become a symbol of extinction in popular culture. Due to a wealth of bones and some tissues, it is possible that this species may live again as it has a close relative in the surviving Nicobar pigeon.
 Elephant bird – Some of the largest birds to have ever existed, the elephant birds were driven to extinction by the early colonization of Madagascar. Ancient DNA has been obtained from the eggshells but may be too degraded for use in de-extinction.
 Carolina parakeet - One of the only indigenous parrots to North America, it was driven to extinction by destruction of its deciduous forest habitat. Hundreds of specimens with viable DNA still exist in museums around the world, making them a prime candidate for revival.
 Great auk - A flightless bird similar to the penguin. The great auk went extinct in the 1800s due to humans hunting them for food. The last two known great auks lived on an island near Iceland and were clubbed to death by sailors. There have been no known sightings since. The great auk has been identified as a good candidate for de-extinction by Revive and Restore, a non-profit organization. Because the great auk is extinct it cannot be cloned, but its DNA can be used to alter a razorbill bird’s genome and breed the hybrids to create a species that will be very similar to the original great auks. The plan is to introduce them back into their original habitat, which they would then share with razorbills and puffins, who are also at risk for extinction. This would help restore the biodiversity and restore that part of the ecosystem.
 Imperial Woodpecker
Ivory-billed Woodpecker
Cuban macaw
 Labrador duck
 Huia
 Moho

Mammals
 Caribbean monk seal
 Irish elk
 Cave lion – The discovery of two preserved cubs in the Sakha Republic ignited a project to clone the animal.
 Steppe bison – The discovery of the mummified steppe bison of 9,000 years ago could help people clone the ancient bison species back, even though the steppe bison would not be the first to be "resurrected". Russian and South Korean scientists are collaborating to clone steppe bison in the future, using DNA preserved from a 8,000 year old tail, in wood bison (morphologically similar), which themselves have been reintroduced to Yakutia.
 Tarpan – A population of free-ranging horses that went extinct in 1909. Much like the aurochs, there have been many attempts to breed tarpan-like horses, the first being by the Heck brothers, creating the Heck horse as a result. Though it is not a genetic copy, it is claimed to bear many similarities to the tarpan. Other attempts were made to create tarpan-like horses. A breeder named Harry Hegardt was able to breed a line of horses from American Mustangs. Other breeds of supposedly tarpan-like horse include the Konik and Strobel's horse.
Baiji
 Steller's sea cow 
Woolly rhinoceros  
Cave bear

Reptiles
 Floreana Island tortoise – In 2008, mitochondrial DNA from the Floreana tortoise species was found in museum specimens.  In theory, a breeding program could be established to "resurrect" a pure Floreana species from living hybrids.

Amphibians
 Gastric-brooding frog – In 2013, scientists in Australia successfully created a living embryo from non-living preserved genetic material, and hope that by using somatic-cell nuclear transfer methods, they can produce an embryo that can survive to the tadpole stage.

Insects

 Xerces blue

Plants
 Rapa Nui palm

See also 

 Breeding back
 Cryoconservation of animal genetic resources
 Endangered species
 Endling
 Holocene extinction
 List of introduced species
 Pleistocene Park
 Pleistocene rewilding
 Woolly mammoth
 List of resurrected species

References

Further reading
 
 
 Pilcher, Helen (2016). Bring Back the King: The New Science of De-extinction . Bloomsbury Press

External links
 TEDx DeExtinction March 15, 2013 conference sponsored by Revive and Restore project of the Long Now Foundation, supported by TEDx and hosted by the National Geographic Society, that helped popularize the public understanding of the science of de-extinction. Video proceedings, meeting report, and links to press coverage freely available.
 De-Extinction: Bringing Extinct Species Back to Life April 2013 article by Carl Zimmer for National Geographic magazine reporting on 2013 conference.

Cloning
Conservation biology
Emerging technologies
Evolution of the biosphere
Extinction